Merlin  is a British fantasy-adventure television programme created by Julian Jones, Jake Michie, Julian Murphy, and Johnny Capps, starring Colin Morgan in the title role. It was broadcast on BBC One from 20 September 2008 to 24 December 2012. The show is loosely based on the Arthurian legends of the young wizard Merlin and his relationship with King Arthur, but it differs from traditional versions. The show was influenced by the US drama series Smallville about the early years of Superman, and was produced by independent production company Shine Limited.

The series was broadcast on BBC One from 20 September 2008 to 24 December 2012.  The five series are available on DVD in the UK, the US and in Canada.

Series overview

Episodes

Series 1 (2008)

Series 2 (2009)

Series 3 (2010)

Series 4 (2011)

Series 5 (2012)

Specials

Children in Need

BBC Wales Exclusive Documentary

Secrets and Magic 
A documentary series created by the BBC called Secrets and Magic was produced to accompany episodes of the second series. In a similar fashion to Doctor Who Confidential, the series looks at the production of each episode of the drama, featuring interviews with cast and crew as well as on-set footage. Shown on BBC Three.

Colin & Bradley's Merlin Quest 
Although Merlin Secrets and Magic was not recommissioned for a second series, Colin & Bradley's Merlin Quest was produced to accompany Series 3 of Merlin. Colin Morgan and Bradley James, who play Merlin and Arthur in Merlin, appear in a weekly series of short (usually 2 to 4 minutes) online videos posted on the official site of Merlin. In each episode the actors have to complete various challenges and tasks, including questions and games with Merlin bloopers shown regularly. Colin & Bradley's Merlin Quest was produced by Ian Smith with Luke Baker as assistant producer.

Ratings

References

External links
Merlin on BBC

Episodes
Merlin
Merlin episodes
Merlin